Members of the New South Wales Legislative Assembly who served in the 53rd parliament held their seats from 2003 to 2007. They were elected at the 2003 state election, and at by-elections. The Speaker was John Aquilina.

See also
Fourth Carr Ministry
First Iemma ministry
Results of the 2003 New South Wales state election (Legislative Assembly)
Candidates of the 2003 New South Wales state election

References

Members of New South Wales parliaments by term
20th-century Australian politicians